Elachista ievae is a moth in the family Elachistidae. It was described by Sruoga in 2008. It is found in Nepal. The habitat consists of mixed primary forests.

The wingspan is about 8.7 mm. The forewings are blackish brown with white markings with a weak lustre and a yellowish tint. The hindwings are dark brown.

Etymology
The species is named after the daughter of the author, Ieva.

References

Moths described in 2008
ievae
Moths of Asia